Colp is a village in Williamson County, Illinois, United States. The population was 225 at the 2010 census.

History
Colp was established in the early 1900s and named for John Colp (1849–1920), whose mining company opened a mine in the area in 1901.  The Illinois Central Railroad extended a line to the mine in 1904.  The village incorporated in 1915.

Colp mayor Frank Caliper was one of the state's longest-serving elected officials. He served 52 years as mayor from 1935 until his death on March 28, 1987.

Geography

Demographics

At the 2000 census, there were 224 people, 103 households and 60 families residing in the village. The racial makeup of the village was 76.34% White, 21.43% African American, 0.89% Native American, 0.45% from other races, and 0.89% from two or more races.

There were 103 households, of which 23.3% had children under the age of 18 living with them, 40.8% were married couples living together, 15.5% had a female householder with no husband present, and 40.8% were non-families. 33.0% of all households were made up of individuals, and 12.6% had someone living alone who was 65 years of age or older. The average household size was 2.17 and the average family size was 2.75.

Age distribution was 22.8% under the age of 18, 10.3% from 18 to 24, 26.8% from 25 to 44, 21.9% from 45 to 64, and 18.3% who were 65 years of age or older. The median age was 38 years. For every 100 females, there were 89.8 males. For every 100 females age 18 and over, there were 86.0 males.

The median household income was $14,722, and the median family income was $14,286. Males had a median income of $26,250 versus $11,875 for females. The per capita income for the village was $13,769. About 44.8% of families and 37.6% of the population were below the poverty line, including 53.3% of those under the age of eighteen and 25.0% of those 65 or over.

References

Villages in Illinois
Villages in Williamson County, Illinois